The Star Awards for Social Media Award is an award presented annually at the Star Awards, a ceremony that was established in 1994.

The category was introduced in 2014, at the 20th Star Awards ceremony; Jeanette Aw received the award and it is given in honour of a Mediacorp artiste with the most social media engagement. The results are based on the calculations from three international social media analysis systems; artistes must be active on at least one of the following platforms in order to qualify: Facebook, Twitter and Instagram. 

Since its inception, the award has been given to two artistes. Carrie Wong is the most recent and final winner in this category. Since the ceremony held in 2016, Aw remains as the only artiste to win in this category twice, surpassing Wong who has one win.

The award was discontinued from 2017 onwards as the popularity element of the award is already represented in the Top 10 Most Popular Male Artistes and Top 10 Most Popular Female Artistes awards.

Recipients

Category facts

Most wins

References

External links 

Star Awards